Great Lever is a suburb of Bolton, Greater Manchester, England. The district is served by frequent buses running to Bolton town centre, Farnworth and the Royal Bolton Hospital. The population is 16,969.

Religion

The parish church of St. Michael (with St Bartholomew) is a Grade 2 listed building.

Landmarks
On Green Lane there is one  large public house: Southfield's, a pub and restaurant and The Brooklyn (now a private school). Both were houses built for local mill owners.

Beehive Mill (now demolished) on Crescent Road.

On the opposite side of Green Lane from the park are the grounds of Bolton Cricket Club. The two conjoined Doe Hey Reservoirs are used for private fishing. Will Hill Brook, which drains into the Doe Hey Reservoirs, forms the southern boundary between Great Lever and Farnworth.

Education
Primary schools in Great Lever include Bishop Bridgeman CE Primary School, Essa Primary School, Lever Edge Primary Academy, St Michael's CE Primary School, SS Simon and Jude CE Primary School and St William of York RC Primary School. There are also numerous play-centres for pre-school children.

The former public house, The Brooklyn is now the independent school Lord's College.

The main secondary school in the area is Essa Academy for pupils aged 11 to 16.

People
Footballer Albert Shepherd played for Bolton Wanderers and Newcastle United.
Former Manchester City striker Paul Moulden owned a chip shop in the area and ex-Bolton player Roy Greaves ran a pub called Monteraze here for many years.
Ralph Gubbins, a forward with Bolton Wanderers, Tranmere Rovers and Hull City, lived in Great Lever during his time with Wanderers. Another resident was Wales and Bolton Wanderers striker Wyn Davies who also went on to represent both Manchester clubs.

The architect Charles Holden (1875–1960), known for many London Underground buildings, was born in Great Lever.

Band leader Jack Hylton was born Great Lever in 1892 as John Greenhalgh Hilton.

Sport

The Great Lever football club was briefly prominent in the 1880s, at one point being considered one of the top two in the country.

See also 

 Darcy Lever
 Little Lever

References

External links
 St Mark's School and Church, Fletcher St

Areas of Bolton